The Rarytkin Range is a range of mountains in Chukotka Autonomous Okrug, Russian Far East. Administratively the range is part of Anadyr District.

Geography
The Rarytkin Range is the northernmost subrange of the Koryak Highlands, East Siberian Mountains. It stretches roughly from southeast to northwest in southern Chukotka, along the left bank of the Velikaya River in its middle and lower course. To the northwest flows the Anadyr River and the range acts as an eastern boundary of the Anadyr Lowlands. 

It rises in the central area of the range. 

Lake Krasnoye is located at the feet of the northwestern part of the range. Rare fossil plants of the Maastrichtian and Eocene periods have been found in the range. Some of them are now kept in the Botanical Museum of the Russian Academy of Sciences.

Flora and climate
There are shrub thickets of Japanese stone pine and alder in the lower mountain slopes. The upper elevations are covered with mountain tundra. The Rarytkin Range has a subarctic climate, somewhat moderated by the proximity of the ocean.

Bibliography
Michael C. Boulter, Helen Fisher eds. Cenozoic Plants and Climates of the Arctic

See also
Kakanaut Formation

References

External links
Palaeogene of the Rarytkin ridge, NE part of Koryakskoe Upland
Mountain ranges of Chukotka Autonomous Okrug
Landforms of Siberia
Koryak Mountains

ceb:Khrebet Rarytkin
pl:Rarytkin
ru:Рарыткин